The Good Design movement was an artistic movement or design concept that originated in the 1930s, but took form principally in the United States immediately after the Second World War. Designs made under the influence of Good Design include buildings and furniture, but also everyday objects such as kitchen implements, household objects and garden tools. Names associated with the movement include Charles and Ray Eames, László Moholy-Nagy and Hans Wegner,

The Museum of Modern Art of New York was an influential force on the movement. A major exhibition, Good Design, was held there from 23 September to 30 November 1952. The retrospective exhibition What Was Good Design? MoMA's Message, 1944–56 was also held at MoMA, from 6 May 2009 to 10 January 2011.

References

Further reading

 Paul T. Frankl (1928). New dimensions: the decorative arts of today in words & pictures. New York: Payson & Clarke.
 Edgar Kaufmann ([1950]). Prize designs for modern furniture from the International Competition for Low-Cost Furniture Design. New York: Museum of Modern Art.
  ([1954]). Good design: 5th anniversary. New York: Museum of Modern Art.
 László Moholy-Nagy, Daphne M Hoffmann (1938). The New Vision: Fundamentals of Design, Painting, Sculpture, Architecture. New York: W.W. Norton & Co.
 George Nelson (1948). The Herman Miller Collection: Furniture designed by George Nelson, Charles Eames ... [et al.]. Zeeland: Herman Miller Furniture Company.
 Eliot F. Noyes ([1941]). Organic Design in Home Furnishings. New York: Museum of Modern Art.
 Paul Rand (1947). Thoughts on Design. New York: Wittenborn and Company.

American art movements
American designers
Furniture designers